Lü Jia (died 111 BC), or Lữ Gia in Vietnamese, also called Bảo Công (保公), was the prime minister of Nanyue (Nam Việt) during the reigns of its three last kings (Zhao Yingqi, Zhao Xing and Zhao Jiande).

The Shiji only mentions that Lü Jia served as prime minister during three kings; members of his clan often intermarried with the royal family, over 70 of his kinsmen served as officials in various parts of the Nanyue government. Lü had high prestige in Nanyue, and was overshadowing the king. According to Vietnamese legend, he was a Lạc Việt chief born in Lôi Dương, Cửu Chân (mordern Thọ Xuân District, Thanh Hóa Province, Vietnam).

In 113 BC, Emperor Wu of Han sent Anguo Shaoji (安國少季) to Nanyue to summon Zhao Xing and the Queen Dowager Jiu to Chang'an for an audience with the Emperor. The Queen Dowager was a Han Chinese from Handan. Before she married Zhao Yingqi, she had affair with Anguo Shaoji. Nanyue people did not trust the Queen Dowager; and at that time, king Zhao Xing was young. Fearful of losing her position of authority, the Queen Dowager decided to fully submit to the Han dynasty. It was strongly opposed by Lü and other ministers. Lü decided to revolt; he said he was ill and did not meet with Han envoy. The Queen Dowager wanted to kill Lü, but was stopped by the king. Lü gathered soldiers and planned to revolt. Getting the information, in 112 BC, Emperor Wu dispatched Han Qianqiu (韓千秋) with 2000 soldiers to arrest him. During this time, Lü staged a coup and executed the queen dowager and the king. He crowned Prince Zhao Jiande as new king, and declared war on the Han dynasty.

In 111 BC, Han generals Lu Bode and Yang Pu attacked Nanyue and captured the capital Panyu (mordern Guangzhou). Lü fled with Zhao Jiande, but was captured and executed.

Lü's tomb was in modern Ân Thi District, Hưng Yên Province, Vietnam where he is worshipped by local people together with his brother Lang Công.

References

111 BC deaths
Nanyue
Deified Vietnamese people